The white-faced whitestart or white-faced redstart (Myioborus albifacies) is a species of bird in the family Parulidae. It is endemic to humid highland forests in the tepuis of south-western Venezuela. Due to its isolated range, it is very poorly known.

References

white-faced whitestart
Endemic birds of Venezuela
white-faced whitestart
Taxonomy articles created by Polbot
Birds of the Tepuis